Paw Peters (born July 1, 1976) is a Danish handballer, playing left back. He has played all his career in the Danish league club Fredericia HK.

References

Danish male handball players
1976 births
Living people
Place of birth missing (living people)